William Tompkins may refer to:
 William F. Tompkins (politician), American attorney and member of the New Jersey General Assembly
 William F. Tompkins (United States Army officer), American general

See also
 William Tomkins, English politician